The Virginia Commission for the Blind is a historic building at 3003 Parkwood Avenue in Richmond, Virginia.  It is a U-shaped two-story brick building with Colonial and Georgian Revival features.  It was designed by the prominent Virginia architect J. Binford Walford and completed in 1940.  It is prominent as the principal place associated with the work of Lucian Louis Watts, a leading force in the state to improve the social welfare its blind population.

The building was listed on the National Register of Historic Places in 2016.

See also
National Register of Historic Places listings in Richmond, Virginia

References

Government buildings on the National Register of Historic Places in Virginia
Colonial Revival architecture in Virginia
Government buildings completed in 1940
Buildings and structures in Richmond, Virginia
National Register of Historic Places in Richmond, Virginia